The 2020–21 Albacete Balompié season was the club's 81st season in existence and the fourth consecutive season in the second division of Spanish football. In addition to the domestic league, Albacete participated in this season's edition of the Copa del Rey. The season covered the period from 21 July 2020 to 30 June 2021.

Players

First-team squad

Reserve team

Out on loan

Transfers

In

Out

Pre-season and friendlies

Competitions

Overview

Segunda División

League table

Results summary

Results by round

Matches
The league fixtures were announced on 31 August 2020.

Copa del Rey

Notes

References

External links

Albacete Balompié seasons
Ponferradina